Phakalane is a suburb in Botswana situated a few kilometers from the capital city Gaborone.

It is 12.5 km north of the city centre via the A1 road. It is a commercial and residential area, which has experienced significant growth and development over the past few years.

The suburb is only 16.3 km from the Sir Seretse Khama International Airport a 21 min drive via the A1 and Airport Road.

Phakalane is part of Gaborone North parliamentary constituency.

Schools 
 Phakalane English Medium Schools
 Toddlers Academy

References 

Suburbs of Gaborone